Luke Moore (born 1986) an English professional footballer striker.

Luke Moore may also refer to:
Luke Moore (footballer, born 1988), English semi-professional footballer
Luke Moore (broadcaster)
Luke Moore, character in 13Hrs